Edna Hong (28 January 19133 April 2007) was an American literary scholar and translator, known for her collaboration in translating Søren Kierkegaard's corpus.

Career
Together with her husband Howard Hong, she earned recognition in the world of philosophical translation, in particular vis-à-vis the translation from Danish to English of the works of Søren Kierkegaard. She received a National Book Award for translating Volume 1 of Søren Kierkegaard's Journals and Papers. The couple also founded a Kierkegaard library at St. Olaf based on their own collection of his work.

References

1913 births
2007 deaths
Danish–English translators
20th-century American translators